Xai-Xai District is a district of Gaza Province in south-western Mozambique. The administrative center of the district is Chongoene. The district is located in the south of the province, and borders with Chibuto District in the north, Manjacaze District in the east, Bilene Macia District in the southeast, and with Chókwè District in the west. In the south, it is bounded by the Indian Ocean. It has a population of 188,720 as of 2007.

Geography
The Limpopo River flows through the district to the ocean. The Lumane River, a tributary of the Limpopo, is an outflow of Lake Pave. Other rivers only flow during the rainy season.

The climate of the district is tropical humid.

History
In 1925, Gaza Province was transformed into the district with the administrative center in Chongoene, however, in the same year the center was transferred to Xai-Xai. The settlement due to its location close to the mouth of the Limpopo River, had a tremendous impact on the area. Xai-Xai was renamed Vila João Belo; the original name was returned after the independence.

Demographics
As of 2005, 44% of the population of the district was younger than 15 years. 42% of the population spoke Portuguese. The most common mothertongue among the population was Tsonga. 52% were analphabetic, mostly women.

Administrative divisions
The district is divided into three postos, Chicumbane (five localities), Chongoene (five localities), and Zongoene (three localities). The city of Xai-Xai is incorporated separately and does not belong to the district.

Economy
3% of the households in the district have access to electricity.

Agriculture
In the district, there are 10,000 farms which have on average  of land. The main agricultural products are corn, cassava, cowpea, peanut, sweet potato, and rice. Population of cattle, pigs, sheep, and goats was steadily growing prior to 2005.

Transportation
There is a road network in the district which includes a stretch of the national road EN1, connecting Maputo and Inhambane, as well as secondary roads.

References

Districts in Gaza Province
States and territories established in 1925
1925 establishments in the Portuguese Empire